During the 2008–09 German football season, Borussia Dortmund competed in the Bundesliga.

Season summary
In Jürgen Klopp's first season in charge of Dortmund, they rose to 6th in the final table, but were 2 points shy of qualifying for the revamped UEFA Europa League. Notably, they were one of only two teams to go the league season unbeaten at home (the other being champions Wolfsburg).

Players

First-team squad
Squad at end of season

Left club during season

Transfers

In
 Felipe Santana - Figueirense, 16 May, €2,000,000
 Mohamed Zidan - Hamburg, 17 August, €5,000,000 + Mladen Petrić
 Lee Young-pyo - Tottenham Hotspur, 27 August, undisclosed
 Kevin-Prince Boateng - Tottenham Hotspur, 11 January, loan
 Neven Subotić - Mainz, 4 June
 Tamás Hajnal - Karlsruhe, July, €1,300,000
 Patrick Owomoyela - Werder Bremen
 Christopher Kullmann - Magdeburg
 Damir Vrančić - Mainz
 Bajram Sadrijaj - TSG Thannhausen

Out
 Mladen Petrić - Hamburg, 17 August, part-exchange
 Robert Kovač - Dinamo Zagreb, 29 January, €450,000
 Delron Buckley - Mainz, January, loan
 Giovanni Federico - Karlsruhe, January, loan
 Antonio Rukavina - 1860 Munich, February, loan
 Diego Klimowicz - VfL Bochum, January
 Lukas Kruse - Augsburg, February
 Christopher Nöthe - Rot-Weiß Oberhausen, loan
 Markus Brzenska - MSV Duisburg, loan
 Christian Wörns - retired
 Philipp Degen - released (later joined Liverpool)
 Alexander Bade - released
 Sahr Senesie - released
 Martin Amedick - Kaiserslautern
 Christian Eggert - FSV Frankfurt
 Marc-André Kruska - Club Brugge

Competitions

Bundesliga

League table

References

Notes

Borussia Dortmund seasons
Borussia Dortmund